Jérôme Mannaert (22 February 1902 – 1967) was a French sprinter. He competed in the men's 200 metres at the 1928 Summer Olympics.

References

1902 births
1967 deaths
Athletes (track and field) at the 1928 Summer Olympics
French male sprinters
Olympic athletes of France
Place of birth missing